This is a list of buildings and structures in the island of Santiago, Cape Verde.  The list is ordered by municipality.

Praia
Complexo Desportivo Adega
Capeverdean National Archives (ANCV)
National Auditorium of Cape Verde
Cape Verde National Stadium
Gimnodesportivo Vavá Duarte
Museu Etnográfico da Praia
National Library of Cape Verde
Nelson Mandela International Airport
Francisco Mendes International Airport
Quartel Jaime Mota
National Assembly of Cape Verde
Our Lady of Grace Pro-Cathedral
Palácio Presidencial
Farol de D. Maria Pia (Ponta Temerosa)
Praia Harbor
Quintal da Música
Liceu Domingos Ramos
Estádio da Várzea

Ribeira Grande de Santiago

Nossa Senhora do Rosário church, Cidade Velha
Pillory (Pelourinho), Cidade Velha
Forte Real de São Filipe, Cidade Velha

Santa Catarina
Museu da Tabanca, Chã de Tanque
Estádio de Cumbém, Assomada

Santa Cruz
Estádio Municipal 25 de Julho, Pedra Badejo

São Miguel
Estádio da Calheta, Calheta de São Miguel

Tarrafal
Farol da Ponta Preta, near Monte Graciosa
Estádio Municipal do Tarrafal
Tarrafal camp and museum, Chão Bom

See also
List of buildings and structures in Cape Verde

References

Santiago
 
Buildings structures